The Instruments of Independence is a legal document that established Fiji's independence from the United Kingdom in 1970, when it was handed over by Prince Charles on behalf of the British Monarch on 10 October.

The document is currently missing. The Prime Minister's Office is unsure whether they hold the document, and Fiji Museum Director Sagale Buadromo told the Fiji Live news service on 26 January 2006 that it was not and had never been in their possession.

Government Archivist Setareki Tale said it was possible that the then-Governor-General, Sir Robert Sidney Foster, had returned the document to the United Kingdom - but that was only conjecture. The British High Commission might be asked to help in the search for the document, government sources said.

Instruments of Independence
Fiji
1970 in Fiji
October 1970 events in Oceania